Aglaia silvestris is a species of plant in the family Meliaceae. It is found in Cambodia, India, Indonesia, Malaysia, Papua New Guinea, the Philippines, the Solomon Islands, Thailand, and Vietnam. This plant initiated the naming of the Rocaglamide derivatives silvestrol and episilvestrol. In fact they were derived from the fruits and twigs of Aglaia foveolata.

References

silvestris
Near threatened plants
Taxonomy articles created by Polbot